Joe Palatsides (born 7 July 1965) is a Greek Australian soccer manager and former player. He is the head coach of the Melbourne Victory FC Youth.

Playing career 
A defender, Palatsides began his senior football career with Brunswick Juventus where he quickly became a first team regular, his best season coming in their relegation year where he played in every home-and-away game, scoring 11 goals. He signed with Footscray JUST in 1989, but they would also be relegated, and he eventually made the move to South Melbourne when the National Soccer League moved to the summer format. After two seasons, he transferred to rivals Heidelberg United, where he spent a further three seasons in Australia's top flight competition.

At 29, and with a wealth of senior football experience in Australia behind him, he tried his luck abroad in the country of his origin, firstly with Apollon Kalamarias in the Greek Super League. where he scored 3 goals in 12 appearances.

Coaching career 
Palatsides retired in 2000 in order to become the manager of Poseidon Neas Michanionias and he had three wins and five losses in eight games played. He then joined Kallikratida Chalkidiki club in which he stayed about five years as manager of the club. He joined in 2005 OF Ierapetra where he stayed about two months, from 4 October till 15 December, managing the team in Gamma Ethniki and winning nine out of nine matches. For personal causes he went back to Kallikratida Chalkidiki club until 2008 when he took charge at Zakynthians Olympic Champions Ground, Zakynthos. The club was promoted under his management to  Gamma Ethniki for season 2008-09.
He is also a member of the Australian Professional Footballers' Association (APFA) and he is one of the members that have served on the APFA Executive (with international honours).

On 2 May 2019, the Football Association of Singapore unveiled Joe Palatsides as its new technical director. Palatsides extended his contract in 2021, but ended his stint by mutual agreement citing the COVID-19 pandemic as well as health and personal issues on 9 November the same year. A day later, Palatsides joined Melbourne Victory's Youth Academy as a coach.

References

External links

 APFA Official Website

1965 births
Living people
Australian people of Greek descent
Australian soccer players
Greek footballers
Association football defenders
Australia international soccer players
Australian soccer coaches
Greek football managers
Apollon Pontou FC players
Brunswick Juventus players
South Melbourne FC players
A.P.S. Zakynthos managers
Olympiacos Volos F.C. players
Melbourne City FC non-playing staff
Australian expatriate soccer players
Greek expatriate footballers
Australian expatriate soccer coaches
Greek expatriate football managers
Australian expatriate sportspeople in Greece